The Cartier Island Marine Park (previously known as the Cartier Island Marine Reserve) is an Australian marine park that covers the Cartier Island and reef surrounds, about  north of Broome, Western Australia. It is one of the 13 parks managed under the North-west Marine Parks Network.

While access has been restricted to the marine park for environmental protective measures, there is also a risk of unexploded ordnance as the area has previously been used for defence practise.

Conservation values

Species and habitat
Internationally significant for its abundance and diversity of sea snakes.
Significant feeding populations of green, hawksbill and loggerhead turtles occur around the reefs.
Supports some of the most important seabird rookeries on the North West Shelf including colonies of bridled terns, common noddies, brown boobies, eastern reef egrets, frigatebirds, tropicbirds, red-footed boobies, roseate terns, crested terns and lesser crested terns.
Important staging points/feeding areas for many migratory seabirds.

Bioregions and other features
Covers the North West Shelf and Timor Province provincial bioregions.
Emergent oceanic reefs.
Ann Millicent historic shipwreck.

History
The Marine Park was originally proclaimed under the National Parks and Wildlife Conservation Act 1975 on 21 June 2000 as the Cartier Island Marine Reserve, and proclaimed under the EPBC Act on 14 December 2013 and renamed Cartier Island Marine Park on 9 October 2017.

Summary of protection zones
The Cartier Island Marine park has been assigned IUCN protected area category Ia and is wholly zoned as a Sanctuary Zone.

The following table is a summary of the zoning rules within the Cartier Island Marine Park:

See also

 Protected areas managed by the Australian government

References

External links
 
 North-west Marine Parks Network - Parks Australia
 North-west Commonwealth Marine Parks Network - environment.gov.au (outdated)

Australian marine parks